is a junior college in Osaka, Japan, and is part of the Kansai Iryo Gakuen network.

The institute was founded in 1957 and was established as a Junior College in 1985.

Educational institutions established in 1985
Japanese junior colleges
Universities and colleges in Osaka Prefecture
1985 establishments in Japan
Defunct private universities and colleges in Japan